Jean is a French, English, and Chinese surname.

Origins
Jean may be a French surname from the given name Jean, or an English surname which originated as a variant spelling of Jayne or as a toponymic surname referring to Genoa, Italy. It may also be an Americanised or Anglicised spelling of various Chinese surnames, including Jian and Zhen. Variant spellings of the English and French surnames include Jenn, Jenne, Jeanne, Geen, Genn, and Jeans.

Statistics

French government statistics show 33,393 people with the surname Jean born in France from 1891 to 2000 (see table). Statistics compiled by Patrick Hanks on the basis of the 2011 United Kingdom census and the Census of Ireland 2011 found 305 people with the surname Jean on the island of Great Britain and six on the island of Ireland. In the 1881 United Kingdom census there were 130 bearers of the surname, primarily in London. The 2010 United States census found 21,140 people with the surname Jean, making it the 1,703rd-most-common surname in the country. This represented an increase from 15,321 people (2,172nd-most-common) in the 2000 census. In the 2010 census, 22.9% of the bearers of the surname identified as non-Hispanic white (down from 31.7% in the 2000 census), and 70.2% as non-Hispanic black (up from 55.5% in the 2000 census).

People

Arts and entertainment

Film and television
 Gloria Jean (1926–2018), American actress and singer
 Rodrigue Jean (born 1957), Canadian film director
 Al Jean (born 1961), American screenwriter and producer
 Vadim Jean (born 1963), English film director

Music
 Bernard Jean (born 1948), Canadian oboist
 Martin Jean (born 1960), American organist
 Wyclef Jean (born 1972), American musician, music producer, and actor
 Carlos Jean (born 1973), Spanish DJ
 Anik Jean (born 1977), Canadian pop and rock singer, actress and screenwriter
 Misty Jean (born 1980), Haitian singer and model
 BC Jean (born 1987), American singer-songwriter

Painting and graphics
 Philip Jean (1755–1802), Jersey painter
 Nehemy Jean (born 1931), Haitian painter and graphic artist
 Eugène Jean (born 1951), Haitian painter
 Jean-Baptiste Jean (1953–2002), Haitian painter
 James Jean (born 1979), Taiwanese-born American visual artist

Government and politics
 Léon Jean (1901–1986), French politician, member of the National Assembly with the French Section of the Workers' International
 Bernard Jean (politician) (1925–2012), Canadian politician from New Brunswick
 Fritz Jean (born 1953), Haitian economist and politician, former central bank governor
 Christine Jean (born 1956 or 1957), French environmental activist
 Lorri Jean (born ), American LGBT rights activist
 Michaëlle Jean (born 1957), 27th Governor General of Canada
 Mireille Jean (born 1960), Canadian politician from Quebec
 Lane Jean (born 1958), American politician from Arkansas
 Brian Jean (born 1963), Canadian politician from Alberta
 Ignatius Jean, Saint Lucian legislator

Sport

Association football
 Philippe Jean (footballer) (born 1959), French midfielder
 Earl Jean (born 1971), Saint Lucian striker
 Nesley Jean (born 1985), Bahamian forward
 Lior Jean (born 1986), Israeli defender and midfielder
 Corentin Jean (born 1995), French striker

Other
 Walt Jean (1898–1961), American NFL offensive lineman
 Max Jean (born 1943), French racing driver
 Domingo Jean (born 1969), Dominican baseball pitcher
 Dierry Jean (born 1982), Haitian-born Canadian boxer
 Louis-Philippe Jean (born 1984), Canadian strength athlete
 Olivier Jean (born 1984), Canadian short-track speed skater
 Aurore Jéan (born 1985), French cross-country skier
 Jhohanny Jean (born 1988), Dominican taekwondo practitioner
 Lestar Jean (born 1988), American NFL wide receiver

Other
 Athanase Jean (1861–1932), French country doctor and writer
 Georges Jean (1920–2011), French linguist, semiotician, poet and essayist
 Raymond Jean (1925–2012), French writer
 E. Jean (born 1943), American journalist and advice columnist
 Stella Jean (born 1979), Italian fashion designer
 Michel Jean, Canadian television journalist

References 

Americanized surnames
English-language surnames
French-language surnames
Multiple Chinese surnames
Surnames from given names
Surnames of Haitian origin